Alastair David Shaw Fowler CBE FBA (1930 – 9 October 2022) was a Scottish literary critic, editor, and an authority on Edmund Spenser, Renaissance literature, genre theory, and numerology.

Life and career
Alastair Fowler was born in Glasgow, Scotland in 1930. He was educated at the University of Edinburgh, M.A. (1952). He was subsequently awarded an M.A. (1955), D.Phil. (1957) and D.Litt. (1962) from Oxford. As a graduate student at Oxford, Fowler studied with C. S. Lewis, and later edited Lewis's Spenser's Images of Life.

Fowler was a junior research fellow at Queen's College, Oxford (1955–1959). He also taught at Swansea (1959–1961), and Brasenose College, Oxford (1962–1971). He was Regius Professor of literature at the University of Edinburgh (1972–1984) and also taught intermittently at universities in the United States, including Columbia (1964) and the University of Virginia (1969, 1979, 1985–1998). He delivered the 1980 Warton Lecture on English Poetry.

Known for his editorial work, Fowler's edition of John Milton's Paradise Lost, part of the Longman poets series, has some of the most scholarly and detailed notes on the poem and is widely cited by Milton scholars. Writing in The Guardian, John Mullan called it "a monument of scholarship."

Fowler was critical of some later trends in literary scholarship, including "new historicism". In 2005, he published an extremely critical review of Stephen Greenblatt's Will in the World, which was widely discussed.

Fowler was appointed Commander of the Order of the British Empire (CBE) in the 2014 New Year Honours for services to literature and education. His papers are on deposit at the National Library of Scotland.

Fowler died on 9 October 2022, at the age of 92.

Work

Edited volumes
 C. S. Lewis, Spenser's Images of Life, 1967
 John Milton, Paradise Lost, 1968, revised edition 2006
 Silent Poetry: Essays in Numerological Analysis, 1970
 Topics in Criticism, ed., with Christopher Butler, 1971
 The New Oxford Book of Seventeenth-Century Verse, 1991, 2008
 The Country House Poem, 1994.

Authored volumes (criticism)
 Spenser and the Numbers of Time, 1964.
 Triumphal Forms: Structural Patterns in Elizabethan Poetry, 1970
 Conceitful Thought: Interpretation of English Renaissance Poems, 1975
 Kinds of Literature, 1982.
 A History of English Literature, 1987
 Times Purple Masquers: Stars and the Afterlife in Renaissance English Literature, 1996
 Renaissance Realism, 2003
 How to Write, 2006
 Literary Names: Personal Names in English Literature, 2012

Authored volumes (poetry)
 Seventeen, 1971
 Catacomb Suburb, 1976
 From the Domain of Arnheim, 1982
 Helen's Topless Towers, 1993

Reviews
 Craig, Cairns (1982), Giving Speech to the Silent, which includes a review of From the Domain of Arnheim, in Hearn, Sheila G. (ed.), Cencrastus No. 10, Autumn 1982, pp. 43 & 44,

See also
 Poioumenon

References

External links

1930 births
2022 deaths
Scottish literary critics
Alumni of the University of Edinburgh
Academics of the University of Edinburgh
Commanders of the Order of the British Empire
Fellows of the British Academy
People from Glasgow